The 1933 All-Ireland Minor Hurling Championship was the sixth staging of the All-Ireland Minor Hurling Championship since its establishment by the Gaelic Athletic Association in 1928.

Tipperary entered the championship as the defending champions.

On 8 October 1933 Tipperary won the championship following a 4–6 to 2–3 defeat of Galway in the All-Ireland final. This was their second All-Ireland title in-a-row and their third overall.

Results

All-Ireland Minor Hurling Championship

Semi-finals

Final

Championship statistics

Miscellaneous

Tipperary became the first team to complete back-to-back All-Ireland Championship titles.

External links
 All-Ireland Minor Hurling Championship: Roll Of Honour

Minor
All-Ireland Minor Hurling Championship